Kribbella is a genus of bacteria first discovered in 1999.

List of Species
Kribella comprises the following species:

 Kribbella alba Li et al. 2006
 Kribbella albertanoniae Everest et al. 2013
 Kribbella aluminosa Carlsohn et al. 2007
 Kribbella amoyensis Xu et al. 2012
 Kribbella antibiotica Li et al. 2004
 Kribbella capetownensis Curtis et al. 2020
 Kribbella catacumbae Urzì et al. 2008
 Kribbella deserti Sun et al. 2017
 Kribbella endophytica Kaewkla and Franco 2013
 Kribbella flavida Park et al. 1999
 Kribbella ginsengisoli Cui et al. 2010
 Kribbella hippodromi Everest and Meyers 2008
 Kribbella italica Everest et al. 2015
 Kribbella jejuensis Song et al. 2004
 Kribbella jiaozuonensis Zhao et al. 2019
 Kribbella karoonensis Kirby et al. 2006
 Kribbella koreensis (Lee et al. 2000) Sohn et al. 2003
 Kribbella lupini Trujillo et al. 2006
 Kribbella mirabilis Li et al. 2015
 Kribbella monticola Song et al. 2018
 Kribbella pittospori Kaewkla and Franco 2016
 Kribbella podocarpi Curtis et al. 2018
 Kribbella qitaiheensis Guo et al. 2018
 Kribbella sancticallisti Urzì et al. 2008
 Kribbella sandramycini Park et al. 1999
 Kribbella shirazensis Mohammadipanah et al. 2013
 Kribbella sindirgiensis Ozdemir-Kocak et al. 2018
 Kribbella solani Song et al. 2004
 Kribbella soli Ozdemir-Kocak et al. 2017
 Kribbella speibonae Curtis et al. 2020
 Kribbella swartbergensis Kirby et al. 2006
 Kribbella turkmenica Saygin et al. 2019
 Kribbella yunnanensis Li et al. 2006

References

Further reading

Propionibacteriales
Bacteria genera